Berlin Nöldnerplatz is a railway station in the Rummelsburg quarter of the Lichtenberg borough in Berlin. The station is located on the eponymous square named after the Communist and resistance fighter Erwin Nöldner, killed in 1944, who lived nearby.

References

Berlin S-Bahn stations
Buildings and structures in Lichtenberg